Goitom Kifle (born 3 December 1993) is an Eritrean athlete competing in long-distance events. He represented his country at the 2011 and 2013 World Championships.

He competed at the 2020 Summer Olympics in the men's marathon.

Competition record

Personal bests
Outdoor
3000 metres – 7:59.64 (Los Corrales de Buelna 2010)
5000 metres – 13:22.92 (Rabat 2012)
10,000 metres – 27:32.00 (Eugene 2013)
15 kilometres – 42:26 (Lisbon 2013)
20 kilometres – 57:36 (Marugame 2016)
Half marathon – 1:00:20 (Azpeitia 2014)
 Marathon - 2:05:28 (Valencia 2021)

References

1993 births
Living people
Eritrean male long-distance runners
World Athletics Championships athletes for Eritrea
Athletes (track and field) at the 2016 Summer Olympics
Olympic athletes of Eritrea
Athletes (track and field) at the 2020 Summer Olympics
21st-century Eritrean people